Zoom (also known as Zoom: Academy for Superheroes) is a 2006 American superhero comedy film directed by Peter Hewitt and written by Adam Rifkin and David Berenbaum. Based upon the children's book Amazing Adventures from Zoom's Academy by Jason Lethcoe, the film stars Tim Allen, Courteney Cox, Chevy Chase, Spencer Breslin and Rip Torn. In the film, a former superhero is dragged into training four superpowered youths to become superheroes and combat an approaching threat.

Released theatrically on August 11, 2006 by Columbia Pictures, the film was panned by critics and was a box-office bomb, earning $12.5 million on a $75 million budget. Zoom was nominated for one Razzie Award, Worst Actor for Tim Allen (also nominated for The Santa Clause 3: The Escape Clause and The Shaggy Dog), but he lost to the Wayans brothers Marlon and Shawn Wayans for Little Man.

Plot
During the opening credits, a series of comic book panels recounts the adventures of Team Zenith, five young superheroes led by Jack Shepard ("Captain Zoom") and his older brother Connor Shepard ("Concussion"), who fought to protect the world from various threats. The American military sought to enhance the team's powers using an experimental form of radiation called "Gamma-13". This made Zoom faster and stronger but created a psychotic break in Concussion who becomes paranoid and delusional. Thinking Zoom and the team betrayed him, Concussion killed his teammates Marksman, Ace, and Daravia. Zoom defeated Concussion but lost his powers in the process.

30 years later, Dr. Ed Grant, the scientist behind the original Zenith Project, discovers that Concussion is still alive. Zoom's actions propelled Concussion to a dimensional rift who is now on a return trajectory. General Larraby, the military officer in charge of the Project, decides to form a new Zenith Team to fight him. Jack finds himself dragged back into the Project, this time as an instructor. Larraby gives Jack the choice of a lengthy prison sentence should he refuse or a payment of $500,000 for training the team. Jack reluctantly agrees to help. In their secret base Area 52 (a reference to Area 51), he meets Marsha Holloway, who is a beautiful but clumsy psychologist, a big fan of Zoom's, and knows of him only through the comic book adaptations of the team's adventures.

The project holds an audition of would-be members, and four are selected: Dylan West, a 17-year-old boy possessing invisibility, Summer Jones, a 16-year-old girl with telekinetic powers and empathic senses, Tucker Williams, a 12-year-old overweight boy who can enlarge and inflate his body parts himself at will, and Cindy Collins, a 6-year-old girl with super strength. At first, things do not go well, with Jack being bitter about the past, and his sarcastic attitude disappoints Marsha. Dylan keeps trying to escape, Tucker has self-esteem problems and trouble controlling his powers, and the kids are annoyed by Jack's attitude. The team eventually forces Jack to face the fact that he's not really putting his heart into their training. Slowly things begin to come together as the new team's abilities improve, and they adopt superhero identities: Cindy calls herself "Princess," Tucker becomes "Mega Boy," Dylan chooses "Houdini" and Summer takes the name "Wonder".

Only hours before Concussion is set to arrive on Earth, Dylan discovers a new ability, "mindsight", a rare power that allows him to discover where Concussion will arrive. In his vision, he also discovers the project's true purpose: The military is seeking to test new weaponry to subdue Concussion and will use the new Zenith team as a distraction; worse, the military does not believe the new team has sufficient power to hold him at bay and plans to bombard the children with Gamma-13. Zoom is horrified by the revelation and recruits Marsha to help him rescue the kids before they are bombarded with Gamma-13; during their escape, Marsha also reveals that she secretly possesses a form of rainbow-colored super breath. They make it to Concussion's arrival point and Jack opts to confront him powerless and alone, but the kids refuse to abandon him.

When Concussion arrives, Larraby test fires a neutralizing net to trap Concussion, who easily blasts it away towards Cindy. Fearing for her safety, Zoom's powers return and he pulls her out of the way. Working together, Zoom recreates the original vortex using speed and his Gamma-13 energy, while the team and Marsha guide Concussion into it. Just before they send him back through, Dr. Grant yells to Zoom that if he closes the vortex, they can save Concussion. Zoom closes the vortex and the subsequent energy vacuum pulls the Gamma-13 from Connor which both restores his powers to normal and cures his psychosis. Zoom and Concussion are reunited.

Three months later, Cindy is in a school play of Rapunzel, using her strength to pull the "prince" up the tower when he can't make the climb. Tucker is the goalie on the soccer team. Dylan is dating Summer who is on the cheerleading team, using her telekinetic power to help build an upside-down pyramid. In addition, they still work together with Zoom as the new Zenith Team.

Cast

 Tim Allen as Jack Shepard/Captain Zoom, an ex-superhero with superhuman speed.
 Courteney Cox as Dr. Marsha Holloway, a psychologist on the Zenith Project who blows rainbow-colored blasts of wind.
 Chevy Chase as Dr. Ed Grant, a scientist on the Zenith Project.
 Spencer Breslin as Tucker Williams/Mega Boy, a overweight boy who can enlarge and inflate his body parts at will.
 Rip Torn as General Larraby, the head of the Zenith Project.
 Kate Mara as Summer Jones/Wonder, a teenager who possesses telekinesis and empathic senses.
 Ryan Newman as Cindy Collins/Princess, a little girl with superhuman strength.
 Michael Cassidy as Dylan West/Houdini, a teenager with invisibility and clairsentience.
 Kevin Zegers as Connor Shepard/Concussion, Jack's older brother with concussive blasts who went insane upon being exposed to Gamma-13.
 Alexis Bledel (uncredited) as Ace, a former member of Zoom's team.
 Devon Aoki as Daravia, a former member of Zoom's team.
 Wilmer Valderrama as Marksman, a former member of Zoom's team who also possessed clairsentience.
 Cornelia Guest as Cindy's mother
 Ridge Canipe and Danny McCarthy as Bullies
 Thomas F. Wilson as Dylan's teacher
 David Lander as David, an employee at Wendy's.

Production
In June 2003, Revolution Studios acquired the rights to Zoom’s Academy for the Super Gifted by former Disney/Warner Bros. animator Jason Lethcoe. Peter Hewitt became attached as director in September 2004.

Tim Allen helped write the initial script, saying "It was very different in script form, much darker than when it came out and what the studio and powers that be decided to make it into a family movie; It was a neat idea of what superheroes are really capable of doing."

Zoom was shot in Hamilton, Ontario, Canada.

Release

Theatrical
Zoom was theatrically released on August 11, 2006, by Columbia Pictures.

Home media
Zoom was released on DVD on February 13, 2007, by Sony Pictures Home Entertainment under the name Zoom: Academy for Superheroes.

Reception

Box office
Zoom opened in 2,501 theaters on August 11, 2006 and earned $4.5 million in its opening weekend ranking number nine at the domestic box office. At the end of its run, on September 17, the film had grossed $12 million in the United States and Canada and $516,860 internationally for a worldwide total of $12.5 million. Based on its over $75 million budget, the film was a box office bomb.

Critical response
The site's critical consensus reads, "Lacking the punch and good cheer of The Incredibles and Sky High, Zoom is a dull and laugh-free affair." On Metacritic, the film has a score of 26 out of 100 based on 14 critics, indicating "generally unfavorable reviews". Audiences polled by CinemaScore gave the film an average grade of "B−" on an A+ to F scale.

Awards
Zoom was nominated for one Razzie Award, Worst Actor for Tim Allen (also nominated for The Santa Clause 3: The Escape Clause and The Shaggy Dog), but he lost to the Wayans brothers Marlon and Shawn Wayans for Little Man.

Music

Rupert Gregson-Williams was originally attached to compose the film, but dropped out to work on Over the Hedge, and Christophe Beck stepped in. Christophe Beck scored the music for the film and on its soundtrack.

Soundtrack
Although an official movie soundtrack was not released, the following songs were heard during the film:
 "So Insane" – Smash Mouth
 "Hang On" – Smash Mouth
 "Everyday Superhero" – Smash Mouth
 "Come On Come On" – Smash Mouth
 "Punk Rock 101" – Bowling for Soup
 "The World is New" – Save Ferris
 "Under Pressure" – Queen and David Bowie, cover by Smash Mouth
 "Superman (It's Not Easy)" – Five for Fighting
 "The Middle" – Jimmy Eat World
 "Hero" – Enrique Iglesias
 "Days Like These" – Smash Mouth
 "The Good, the Bad and the Ugly" – Prague Philharmonic Orchestra
 "If She Knew What She Wants" – The Bangles
 "Big Ups" – Triniti Bhaguandas (as Ms. Triniti)
 "It's On" – Superchick

See also
 Hero High
 PS238
 Sky High
 My Hero Academia
 The Magic Roundabout
 Dinosaur King
 Gigabash

References

External links

 
 
 
 

2006 films
2000s adventure comedy films
2000s science fiction comedy films
2000s superhero comedy films
American action comedy films
American science fiction comedy films
American robot films
American superhero films
2000s English-language films
American science fantasy films
Child superheroes
Films about parallel universes
Teen superhero comedy films
Columbia Pictures films
Revolution Studios films
Films scored by Christophe Beck
Films directed by Peter Hewitt
Films shot in Hamilton, Ontario
Film superheroes
Films based on children's books
2006 comedy films
Films produced by Suzanne Todd
2000s American films